Mario Baesso Aparecido (born 5 September 1945) is a former Brazilian footballer.

Career
Mario Baesso began his professional career playing for América-SP, a football club based in São José do Rio Preto (São Paulo state). From 1967 to 1968 has militated in the Oakland Clippers, with which he won the NPSL in 1967, beating in the final double to Baltimore Bays. In the course of 1968 arrives at Club America of Mexico. The year after returns to the Clippers with that plays some of exhibition games. In the same year 1969 arrived in the Salvadoran soccer to play on the C.D. Sonsonate, where he remained for two years.

In 1972 militates in Venezuelan club of Portuguesa FC and won the Venezuelan Championship and the Venezuela Cup. The year following returns home to play with the Volta Redonda. In the course of 1977 passes to the Chileans of Lota Schwager that will leave the following year to play with O'Higgins. In 1980 is to Deportes Iquique, always in Chile.

In 1981 returns home to play in the Vasco da Gama, where disputed only one meeting. The following year is to Desportiva-ES. In 1983 leaves the native country to play with Ecuadorians of Deportivo Quevedo.

References

External links
 Mario Baesso at playmakerstats.com (English version of ceroacero.es)

1945 births
Living people
Brazilian footballers
Brazilian expatriate footballers
Club América footballers
Lota Schwager footballers
O'Higgins F.C. footballers
Deportes Iquique footballers
América Futebol Clube (SP) players
Portuguesa F.C. players
Volta Redonda FC players
CR Vasco da Gama players
Desportiva Ferroviária players
North American Soccer League (1968–1984) players
Oakland Clippers players
Chilean Primera División players
Brazilian expatriate sportspeople in Chile
Expatriate footballers in Chile
Association football forwards
Footballers from São Paulo
Brazilian expatriate sportspeople in the United States
Brazilian expatriate sportspeople in Mexico
Brazilian expatriate sportspeople in El Salvador
Brazilian expatriate sportspeople in Venezuela
Expatriate footballers in Mexico
Expatriate footballers in El Salvador
Expatriate footballers in Venezuela
Expatriate soccer players in the United States